In enzymology, a cis-p-Coumarate glucosyltransferase is an enzyme that catalyzes the chemical reaction

UDP-glucose + cis-p-Coumarate  4'-O-beta-D-glucosyl-cis-p-coumarate + UDP

Thus, the two substrates of this enzyme are UDP-glucose and cis-p-coumarate, whereas its two products are 4'-O-beta-D-glucosyl-cis-p-coumarate and UDP.

This enzyme belongs to the family of glycosyltransferases, specifically the hexosyltransferases.  The systematic name of this enzyme class is UDP-glucose:cis-p-coumarate beta-D-glucosyltransferase.

References

 

EC 2.4.1
Enzymes of unknown structure